Ballymoney United Football Club is an intermediate, Northern Irish football club playing in the Ballymena & Provincial Football League. The club, founded in 1944, hails from Ballymoney, County Antrim and currently plays its home matches at the Ballymoney Showgrounds. Before relegation from the Northern Ireland Football League in 2015, the club played at the Riada Stadium in Ballymoney, which is shared with  Glebe Rangers. Club colours are all blue with a white and black away kit. The current managers are Lee Mcclelland and Stewart McMullan, the Chairman is Noel Lamont who has been chairman for about 6 years.

.

Honours

Intermediate honours
B Division Knock-out Cup: 1
1998–99
Northern Ireland Intermediate League: 3
1980–81, 1982–83, 2015–16

Junior honours
Irish Junior Cup: 1
1960–61†

† Won by reserve side

Notable former players
  Jimmy Kelly

References

External links
 Ballymoney United Website

 

 
Association football clubs established in 1944
Association football clubs in Northern Ireland
NIFL Championship clubs
Association football clubs in County Antrim
1944 establishments in Northern Ireland
United